MusicPrinter Plus is a DOS-based scorewriter program, created by Temporal Acuity Products, Inc.

History
Music Printer Plus was developed by Dr. Jack Jarrett. It grew out of earlier work on a piece of software called Music Printer that ran on IBM PC and compatibles computers. It was first released in 1988 and was discontinued in 1995. Although a Windows version was planned, one was not developed. Plans for the Windows version evolved into Dr. Jarrett's current project Notion.

Capabilities
MusicPrinter Plus contained some advanced mechanisms for its day, including playback of articulations and synchronization to SMPTE and other time code.

References

 MIDI Classics article about MusicPrinter Plus

Scorewriters
DOS software